The 1996 SWAC men's basketball tournament was held March 7–9, 1996, at the Riverside Centroplex in Baton Rouge, Louisiana.  defeated , 111–94 in the championship game. The Delta Devils received the conference's automatic bid to the 1996 NCAA tournament as No. 15 seed in the East Region.

Bracket and results

References

1995–96 Southwestern Athletic Conference men's basketball season
SWAC men's basketball tournament